was a Japanese aristocrat from the Heian period. She was the concubine of Taira no Kiyomori, mother of Taira no Tokuko, and grandmother of Emperor Antoku. Later she took the vows to become a nun, after which she was generally referred to by her Buddhist name as the "Nun of the Second Rank" (Nii no Ama 二位尼).

After Kiyomori's death in 1181, Tokiko's son, Taira no Munemori, became the head of the Taira clan. After this, she became the representative pillar of the Taira clan. According to the Tale of the Heike, Taira no Tokiko drowned herself during the Battle of Dan-no-ura together with her grandson, Taira no Tokushi.

Honours 

 Japanese Court Upper Rank: Junior Second Rank (従二位)

See also 

 List of female castellans in Japan

References

Further reading
 Brown, Delmer and Ichiro Ishida, eds. (1979). [ Jien (1221)], Gukanshō; "The Future and the Past: a translation and study of the 'Gukanshō,' an interpretive history of Japan written in 1219" translated from the Japanese and edited by Delmer M. Brown & Ichirō Ishida. Berkeley: University of California Press. 
 Kitagawa, Hiroshi and Bruce T. Tsuchida. (1975). The Tale of the Heike. Tokyo: University of Tokyo Press. 
 McCullough, Helen Craig. (1994). Genji and Heike. Selections from The Tale of the Genji and The Tale of the Heike. Stanford: Stanford University Press. 
 Watson, Burton and Haruo Shirane. (2006). The Tales of the Heike (abridged).  New York: Columbia University Press. 

Taira clan
1126 births
1185 deaths
Ladies-in-waiting of Heian-period Japan
Heian period Buddhist nuns
Deified Japanese people
Suicides by drowning in Japan